The Audi Q6 is a mid-size luxury crossover SUV with three-row seating produced by Audi through SAIC Audi joint venture in China since 2022. It was released in July 2022.

Overview 
The Audi Q6 shares the same MQB Evo platform with the similarly sized Volkswagen Talagon and Teramont/Atlas. While not a flagship model, it is the largest model currently marketed by Audi, outnumbering the Q7 and Q8 by exterior dimensions. It is mechanically unrelated to the upcoming Q6 e-tron.

Design wise, Audi officially calls the Audi Q6 a "land jet", and according to the Q6 designer Siming Yan, the exterior design of the Q6 was inspired by the kirin.

Powertrain 
In China, three engine options are offered, which are 2.0-litre petrol engine marketed as 40TFSI Quattro, 2.0-litre petrol engine with higher power output marketed as 45TFSI Quattro and a 2.5-litre VR6 petrol engine marketed as 50TFSI Quattro.

References

External links 

Q6
Cars introduced in 2022
Mid-size sport utility vehicles
Luxury crossover sport utility vehicles
All-wheel-drive vehicles